Brandon Hambright Grove Jr. (April 8, 1929 – May 20, 2016) was the United States Ambassador to the German Democratic Republic (East Germany) and Zaire (1984–87) and served on the board of directors of the American Academy of Diplomacy.

Grove received an undergraduate degree from Bard College in 1950 and a master's degree in public administration from Princeton University in 1952.

Ambassador Brandon Grove's diplomatic career spanned thirty-five years in the U.S. Foreign Service under nine presidents and twelve secretaries of state.

Born in Chicago (April 8, 1929), he held degrees from Bard College and the Woodrow Wilson School of Princeton University. As an amphibious boat group commander in the U.S. Navy, he served to the rank of Lieutenant. Before joining the U.S. Foreign Service in 1959, he worked on the staff of Congressman Chester Bowles, of Connecticut.

His diplomatic assignments took him to posts in Africa, India, East and West Berlin, and Jerusalem, where he was consul general during Israel's war with Lebanon.  In 1974, he became the first American diplomat accredited to East Germany, where he established the embassy in Berlin.  During 1984-87, he served as President Reagan's ambassador to Zaire.

Among assignments in Washington, he twice filled positions managing U.S. relations with Panama, Central America, and the Caribbean, first as director of the Office of Panamanian Affairs, and later as deputy assistant secretary of state for Inter-American Affairs. He served on the policy planning staffs of secretaries of state Henry Kissinger and Warren Christopher.

Ambassador Grove, during 1988-92, was director of the State Department's Foreign Service Institute responsible for foreign affairs training throughout the government. He coordinated the design and construction of its permanent facility at Arlington Hall, Virginia. At Hamilton College, Grove was the Sol M. Linowitz Professor of International Affairs, teaching a course on diplomacy in practice.

In 2000, Bard College awarded him its John Dewey Medal for Distinguished Public Service, and in 2010 the honorary degree of Doctor of Humane Letters for his lifetime contributions to diplomacy. He has three times received the President's Meritorious Service Award.

The University of Missouri Press published his autobiography, Behind Embassy Walls: The Life and Times of an American Diplomat, in June 2005.

Ambassador Grove was president emeritus of the American Academy of Diplomacy.

Grove, Jr. died from complications of cancer on May 20, 2016 in Washington, D.C., aged 87.

Publications
 Behind embassy walls: the life and times of an American diplomat (2005)

References

|-

1929 births
2016 deaths
Bard College alumni
People from Chicago
Writers from Illinois
Princeton School of Public and International Affairs alumni
United States Foreign Service personnel
United States Inspectors General by name
Ambassadors of the United States to East Germany
Ambassadors of the United States to the Democratic Republic of the Congo